Arty may refer to:

People
 Arty (Queen), 8th century BC wife of Pharaoh Shebitku
 Arty (musician) (born 1989), Russian record producer and DJ born Artem Stolyarov
 Arty Ash, stage name of British actor Arthur Richard Dodge (1895–1954)
 A nickname of Ray Holmes (1914–2005), British Royal Air Force fighter pilot who rammed a German bomber during the Battle of Britain, protecting Buckingham Palace
 Arty Hill, 21st century American country music singer-songwriter
 Arty McGlynn (1944–2019), Irish guitarist
 Mary Ann Arty (1926–2000), American politician

Other uses
 Arty (magazine), an independent British art fanzine started in 2001
 Military term for artillery

See also
 Artie, a masculine given name
 Artie, West Virginia, United States, an unincorporated community
 RT (disambiguation)
 Artemis (disambiguation)